The Bulgaria men's national basketball team represents Bulgaria in international basketball. The governing body is the Bulgarian Basketball Federation.

Bulgaria's first appearance at an international tournament came at the EuroBasket in 1935. They have reached the premier European basketball competition 25 times, with their best results coming in 1957 as the runners-up on home soil, and their bronze medal finish in 1961 respectively. Bulgaria has also qualified for the FIBA World Cup, where they finished seventh in their lone appearance in 1959. Competing at the Olympic Games multiple times, the national team had their top performance in 1956. Bulgaria has also competed at smaller events, such as the Balkan Championship, winning gold medals in 1959, 1960, and 1971.

History

EuroBasket 1935
Bulgaria debuted on the international stage at the first EuroBasket (European Basketball Championship), which was held in Geneva, in 1935. The Bulgarian side started the tournament off with a loss to Italy in the preliminary round, but bounced back to defeat Hungary in their next match. Following this, Bulgaria lost their classification matches to Belgium, and to Italy again. The national team would finishing off their tournament debut in 8th place.

EuroBasket 1947
Twelve years later, the Bulgarian national team reached the tournament once again, for their second appearance overall. At the EuroBasket 1947, Bulgaria split their two preliminary round matches against Austria, and France advancing to the upper bracket semifinal groups. There they lost all three of their games, putting them in a 7th/8th place classification match versus Hungary, which they lost. The national team would once again end the tournament reaching the quarterfinals.

EuroBasket 1951
Bulgaria's third appearance was at EuroBasket 1951 in Paris. They won their two contested preliminary games, outscoring opponents 145–70, and gained a third win by Romania's forfeit. In the semifinal round, the national team became enmeshed in a three-way tie for first place in the four-team group after losing to France but winning the other two matches, and ended up finishing in second place in the group. This pitted them against the Soviet Union in a semifinal matchup, which the Bulgarians lost. The national team then went on to lose again, in the bronze medal game to France.

EuroBasket 1953
The national team's next appearance was in Moscow for EuroBasket 1953. They found themselves on the unfortunate end of a three-way tiebreaker after finishing 3–1 in their preliminary group, and their 3rd place rank in the group sent them to the classification round, a disappointing turn of events for Bulgaria which had expected to do at least as well as they had two years prior. They won their next five matches to take the highest place available, after the preliminary round. Thus, reaching the quarterfinals in the tournament with an 8–1 record.

EuroBasket 1955
At EuroBasket 1955 in Budapest, the Bulgarian side open up their campaign at the tournament with a 107-33 dismantling of Denmark. They would go on to only drop one match in their preliminary group to finish with a 2–1 record, which allowed them to advance to the final round along with group leader Czechoslovakia. After losing to the three eventual medalists in the final round, Bulgaria finished the round with a 4–3 record while once again reaching the semifinals.

EuroBasket 1957
Bulgaria hosted the EuroBasket 1957, in Sofia. The national team breezed through their three preliminary round matches, and kept their win streak through the first six of the final round games, including an 82–80 victory over Czechoslovakia.  In their final game of the tournament, which by chance was against the similarly undefeated Soviet Union squad, Bulgaria led by 4 points at halftime, 23–19. Their lead did not last through the second half though, however, as the Soviets powered to a 60–57 final, Bulgaria finished as the runners-up with the silver medal.

1959 World Cup
Bulgaria made its debut at the World Cup in 1959. They were placed in Group C, where they went undefeated (3-0) and advanced to the final round. There, they finished with a 2–4 record, but after controversy struck. As they along with the Soviets refused to play Formosa, due to political reasons. This mishap caused the national team to be relegated to seventh place at the tournament.

EuroBasket 1961
At the EuroBasket 1961, the national team returned to the top European basketball tournament looking to place better than their last trip at the event. In their preliminary round group they finished with a 2–0 record to move on to the second round. There they finished with an impressive 4–1 record to advance to the semifinals with a matchup against the Soviet Union. The outcome did not turn out in the favour of the Bulgarian side though, as they were manhandled 77–54. The devastating loss sent the Bulgarians to the bronze medal match versus France, where they came away with a victory to end the tournament on a high note.

Later years
Bulgaria would go on to qualify to the European Basketball Championship 16 more times after 1961, but never came away with a top three finish at the event. The Bulgarian side have endured multiple droughts without qualifying as well, e.g. not reaching the tournament for 12 years after EuroBasket 1993 until EuroBasket 2005. As well as not having qualified to the tournament since 2011. They have also attempted to qualify for the World Cup on numerous occasions since 1959, although they have yet to succeed in their bid.

Competitive record

FIBA World Cup

Olympic Games

EuroBasket

Results and fixtures

2021

2022

2023

Team

Current roster
Roster for the EuroBasket 2025 Pre-Qualifiers matches on 23 and 26 February 2023 against Romania and Portugal.

Depth chart

Head coach position
 Rosen Barchovski – (2004–2007)
 Pini Gershon – (2008–2010)
 Rosen Barchovski – (2010–2012)
 Konstantin Papazov – (2013)
 Georgi Mladenov – (2014)
 Lubomir Minchev – (2015–2019)
 Rosen Barchovski – (2019–present)

Notable players
Atanas Golomeev – Most decorated Bulgarian basketball player of all-time. As he was named one of FIBA's 50 Greatest Players.
Georgi Glouchkov – First player from an Eastern bloc country to compete in the American National Basketball Association (NBA)

Past rosters
1935 EuroBasket: finished 8th among 10 teams

3 Krum Konstantinov, 4 Pinkas, 5 Etropolski, 6 Rogachev, 7 Tsankov, 8 Kevorkjan, 9 Khaimov (Coach: Krum Konstantinov)

1947 EuroBasket: finished 8th among 14 teams

3 Veselin Temkov, 4 Krhisto Khajtov, 5 Ljudmil Katerinski, 6 Aleksandar Damjanov, 7 Sharkov, 8 Kosanov, 9 Peev, 10 Konstantin Georgiev, 11 Nikola Kolev, 12 Rajkov, 13 Bozhidar Takev, 14 Ilija Asenov, 15 Stefan Bankov (Coach: Georgi Petkov)

1951 EuroBasket: finished 4th among 17 teams

3 Iliya Georgiev, 4 Stefan Bankov, 5 Neycho Neychev, 6 Vladimir Savov, 7 Ilija Asenov, 8 Petar Shishkov, 9 Kiril Semov, 10 Konstantin Totev, 11 Anton Kuzov, 12 Gencho Khristov, 13 Ivan Nikolov, 14 Dimitar Popov, 15 Metodi Tomovski, 16 Konstantin Georgiev (Coach: Veselin Temkov)

1952 Olympic Games: finished 7th among 23 teams

3 Iliya Georgiev, 4 Kiril Semov, 5 Neycho Neychev, 6 Khristo Donchev, 7 Vasil Manchenko, 8 Petar Shishkov, 9 Georgi Panov, 10 Konstantin Totev, 11 Anton Kuzov, 12 Gencho Khristov, 13 Ivan Nikolov, 14 Veselin Penkov, 15 Konstantin Georgiev, 16 Vladimir Savov (Coach: Veselin Temkov)

1953 EuroBasket: finished 9th among 17 teams

3 Iliya Georgiev, 4 Vladimir Stefanov, 5 Velko Velkov, 6 Khristo Donchev, 7 Vasil Manchenko, 8 Konstantin Georgiev, 9 Georgi Panov, 10 Konstantin Totev, 11 Anton Kuzov, 12 Dimitar Popov, 13 Lyubomir Panov, 14 Veselin Penkov, 15 Iliya Mirchev, 16 Vladimir Savov (Coach: Veselin Temkov)

1955 EuroBasket: finished 4th among 18 teams

3 Vasil Manchenko, 4 Vladimir Ganchev, 5 Iliya Mirchev, 6 Rajkov, 7 Gencho Khristov, 8 Anton Kuzov, 9 Georgi Panov, 10 Konstantin Totev, 11 Cvjatko Barchovski, 12 Metodi Tomovski, 13 Viktor Radev, 14 Emanuil Gyaurov (Coach: Bozhidar Takev)

1956 Olympic Games: finished 5th among 15 teams

3 Atanas Atanasov, 4 Vladimir Savov, 5 Iliya Mirchev, 6 Viktor Radev, 7 Georgi Kanev, 8 Vasil Manchenko, 9 Georgi Panov, 10 Konstantin Totev, 11 Tsvetko Slavov, 12 Lyubomir Panov, 13 Nikolay Ilov (Coach: Ljudmil Katerinski)

1957 EuroBasket: finished 2nd  among 16 teams

3 Mikhail Semov, 4 Vladimir Ganchev, 5 Iliya Mirchev, 6 Viktor Radev, 7 Georgi Kanev, 8 Petko Lazarov, 9 Georgi Panov, 10 Konstantin Totev, 11 Tsvetko Slavov, 12 Lyubomir Panov, 13 Metodi Tomovski, 14 Atanas Atanasov (Coach: Ljudmil Katerinski)

1959 FIBA World Cup: finished 7th among 13 teams

3 Mikhail Semov, 4 Gencho Khristov, 5 Iliya Mirchev, 6 Viktor Radev, 7 Georgi Kanev, 8 Petko Lazarov, 9 Georgi Panov, 10 Emanuil Gyaurov, 11 Tsvetko Slavov, 12 Lyubomir Panov, 13 Metodi Tomovski, 14 Atanas Atanasov (Coach: Ljudmil Katerinski)

1959 EuroBasket: finished 5th among 17 teams

3 Angel Shipkov, 5 Iliya Mirchev, 6 Viktor Radev, 7 Georgi Kanev, 8 Petko Lazarov, 9 Georgi Panov, 10 Khristo Donchev, 12 Mikhail Semov, 13 Nikolay Ilov, 14 Atanas Atanasov, 15 Tsvetko Slavov, 16 Gencho Khristov (Coach: Ljudmil Katerinski)

1960 Olympic Games: finished 16th among 16 teams

3 Stefan Stoykov, 5 Iliya Mirchev, 6 Viktor Radev, 7 Georgi Kanev, 8 Petko Lazarov, 9 Georgi Panov, 10 Emanuil Gyaurov, 11 Tsvetko Slavov, 12 Lyubomir Panov, 13 Nikolay Ilov, 14 Atanas Atanasov, 15 Khristo Tsvetkov (Coach: Nikola Kolev)

1961 EuroBasket: finished 3rd  among 19 teams

4 Mincho Dimov, 5 Iliya Mirchev, 6 Viktor Radev, 7 Stefan Stoykov, 8 Petko Lazarov, 9 Georgi Panov, 10 Khristo Donchev, 11 Tsvetko Slavov, 12 Lyubomir Panov, 13 Khristo Tsvetkov, 14 Atanas Atanasov, 15 Radko Zlatev (Coach: Veselin Temkov)

1963 EuroBasket: finished 5th among 16 teams

4 Stefan Filipov, 5 Iliya Mirchev, 6 Viktor Radev, 7 Georgi Kanev, 8 Mincho Dimov, 9 Georgi Panov, 10 Dimitar Donev, 11 Tsvetko Slavov, 12 Lyubomir Panov, 13 Nikola Atanasov, 14 Atanas Atanasov, 15 Kliment Kamenarov (Coach: Kiril Khajtov)

1965 EuroBasket: finished 5th among 16 teams

4 Mincho Dimov, 6 Pando Pandov, 7 Georgi Barzakov, 8 Emil Mikhaylov, 9 Valentin Spasov, 10 Kamen Ilchev, 11 Stefan Filipov, 12 Borislav Kolev, 13 Slavey Raychev, 14 Atanas Atanasov, 15 Radko Zlatev, 16 Boto Paspalanov (Coach: Kiril Semov)

1967 EuroBasket: finished 4th among 16 teams

4 Emil Mikhaylov, 5 Slavey Raychev, 6 Pando Pandov, 7 Khristo Doychinov, 8 Georgi Guenev, 9 Boris Krastev, 10 Mincho Dimov, 11 Cvjatko Barchovski, 12 Ivan Vodenicharski, 13 Boycho Branzov, 14 Temelaki Dimitrov, 15 Georgi Khristov (Coach: Kiril Khajtov)

1968 Olympic Games: finished 10th among 16 teams

4 Emil Mikhaylov, 5 Stanislav Boyadzhiev, 6 Pando Pandov, 7 Khristo Doychinov, 8 Valentin Spasov, 9 Stefan Filipov, 10 Mincho Dimov, 11 Ivaylo Kirov, 12 Dimitar Sakhanikov, 13 Boycho Branzov, 14 Slavey Raychev, 15 Georgi Khristov (Coach: Kiril Khajtov)

1969 EuroBasket: finished 7th among 12 teams

4 Khristo Doychinov, 5 Rumen Pejchev, 6 Atanas Golomeev, 7 Dimitar Galabov, 8 Ivan Rusinov, 9 Georgi Barzakov, 10 Mincho Dimov, 11 Bogomil Chanev, 12 Stancho Kostov, 13 Boycho Branzov, 14 Temelaki Dimitrov, 15 Georgi Khristov (Coach: Dimitar Mitev)

1971 EuroBasket: finished 6th among 12 teams

4 Rumen Pejchev, 5 Stefan Filipov, 6 Pando Pandov, 7 Khristo Doychinov, 9 llija Yankov, 10 Boto Paspalanov, 11 Atanas Golomeev, 12 Docho Petrov, 13 Ivaylo Kirov, 14 Slavey Raychev, 15 Georgi Khristov, 16 Bogomil Chanev (Coach: Dimitar Mitev)

1973 EuroBasket: finished 6th among 12 teams

4 Khristo Doychinov, 5 Georgi Stojanov, 6 Pando Pandov, 7 Rumen Pejchev, 8 Ivaylo Kirov, 9 Khristo Borisov, 10 Marin Romanski, 11 Atanas Golomeev, 12 Boris Krastev, 13 Boycho Branzov, 14 Bogomil Chanev, 15 Georgi Khristov (Coach: Nejcho Nejchev)

1975 EuroBasket: finished 5th among 12 teams

4 Khristo Doychinov, 5 Valentin Petkov, 6 Atanas Stojanov, 7 Docho Petrov, 8 Mikhail Mikhajlov, 9 Valentin Sharkov, 10 Marin Romanski, 11 Atanas Golomeev, 12 Mikhail Dukov, 13 Boycho Branzov, 14 Temelaki Dimitrov, 15 Georgi Khristov (Coach: Ivan Kolev)

1977 EuroBasket: finished 6th among 12 teams

4 Milko Arabadzhijski, 5 Linben Yosifov, 6 Petko Marinov, 7 Stojan Shantov, 8 Ilija Evtimov, 9 Mikail Smochevski, 10 Valentin Sharkov, 11 Atanas Golomeev, 12 Plamen Takev, 13 Atanas Kolev, 14 Todor Bogdanov, 15 Rumen Pejchev (Coach: Nejcho Nejchev)

1979 EuroBasket: finished 11th among 12 teams

4 Georgi Glouchkov, 5 Atanas Kolev, 6 Dimitar Donov, 7 Mikhail Manolov, 8 Ilija Evtimov, 9 Hristo Borissov, 10 Valentin Sharkov, 11 Rumen Pejchev, 12 Ognjan Rusev, 13 Milko Arabadzhijski, 14 Todor Bogdanov, 15 Dimitar Marchin (Coach: Ivan Todorov)

1985 EuroBasket: finished 8th among 12 teams

4 Kojo Koev, 5 Atanas Kolev, 6 Jordan Kolev, 7 Rosen Barchovski, 8 Ilija Evtimov, 9 Saško Vezenkov, 10 Ivan Cenov, 11 Georgi Mladenov, 12 Cvetan Antov, 13 Emil Jonov, 14 Georgi Glouchkov, 15 Ljubomir Amiorkov (Coach: Cvjatko Barchovski)

1989 EuroBasket: finished 7th among 8 teams

4 Kojo Koev, 5 Eduard Vălčev, 6 Jordan Kolev, 7 Robert Gergov, 8 Georgi Glouchkov, 9 Ventsislav Slavov, 10 Ivan Cenov, 11 Saško Vezenkov, 12 Georgi Mladenov, 13 Emil Jonov, 14 Cvetan Antov, 15 Ljubomir Amiorkov (Coach: Kiril Semov)

1991 EuroBasket: finished 8th among 8 teams

4 Ivajlo Ravucov, 5 Cvetan Nedelčev, 6 Jordan Kolev, 7 Robert Gergov, 8 Spas Natov, 9 Plamen Petrov, 10 Ivan Cenov, 11 Saško Vezenkov, 12 Georgi Mladenov, 13 Daniel Dimitrov, 14 Georgi Glouchkov, 15 Lubomir Amiorkov (Coach: Saško Vezenkov)

1993 EuroBasket: finished 16th among 16 teams

4 Stanislav Stankov, 5 Anton Kharalanov, 6 Dimo Kostov, 7 Ivajlo Ravutsov, 8 Spas Natov, 9 Ventsislav Slavov, 10 Daniel Dimitrov, 11 Vladimir Dimitrov, 12 Georgi Mladenov, 13 Vasil Stojanov, 14 Robert Gergov, 15 Lubomir Amiorkov (Coach: Saško Vezenkov)

2005 EuroBasket: finished 13th among 16 teams

4 Dejan Ivanov, 5 Kaloyan Ivanov, 6 Tenčo Banev, 7 Yulian Radionov, 8 Filip Videnov, 9 Yordan Bozov, 10 Georgi Davidov, 11 Dimitar Angelov, 12 Stefan Georgiev, 13 Boyko Mladenov, 14 Hrisimir Dimitrov, 15 Todor Stoykov (Coach: Rosen Barchovski)

2009 EuroBasket: finished 16th among 16 teams

4 Deyan Ivanov, 5 Kaloyan Ivanov, 6 Chavdar Kostov, 7 Earl Rowland, 8 Filip Videnov, 9 Stanislav Slaveykov, 10 Stefan Georgiev, 11 Dimitar Angelov, 12 Vassil Evtimov, 13 Boyko Mladenov, 14 Bozhidar Avramov, 15 Todor Stoykov (Coach: Pini Gershon)

2011 EuroBasket: finished 13th among 24 teams

4 Dejan Ivanov, 5 Kaloyan Ivanov, 6 Earl Rowland, 7 Chavdar Kostov, 8 Filip Videnov, 9 Pavel Marinov, 10 Bozhidar Avramov, 11 Zlatin Georgiev, 12 Aleksandar Yanev, 13 Asen Velikov, 14 Tencho Banev, 15 Nikolay Varbanov (Coach: Rosen Barchovski)

2022 EuroBasket: finished 20th among 24 teams

0 Ivan Alipiev, 1 Dee Bost, 2 Deyan Karamfilov, 9 Chavdar Kostov (C), 12 Aleksandar Yanev, 17 Emil Stoilov, 22 Pavlin Ivanov,23 Stanimir Marinov, 24 Andrey Ivanov, 34 Dimitar Dimitrov, 41 Aleksandar Vezenkov, 99 Alex Simeonov (Coach: Rosen Barchovski)

See also

Sport in Bulgaria
Bulgaria women's national basketball team
Bulgaria men's national under-20 basketball team
Bulgaria men's national under-18 basketball team
Bulgaria men's national under-16 basketball team

References

External links

 
Bulgaria FIBA profile
Bulgarian National Team – Men at Eurobasket.com
Bulgaria Basketball Records at FIBA Archive

Men's national basketball teams
 
Basketball
1935 establishments in Bulgaria